Oudom Khattigna (Lao: ອຸດົມ ຂັດຕິຍະ; 3 March 1931 – 9 December 1999) was the 2nd Vice President of Laos from 1998 to 1999. He died in office.

References

Specific

Bibliography
Books:
 

Vice presidents of Laos
Members of the 3rd Central Committee of the Lao People's Revolutionary Party
Members of the 4th Central Committee of the Lao People's Revolutionary Party
Members of the 5th Central Committee of the Lao People's Revolutionary Party
Members of the 6th Central Committee of the Lao People's Revolutionary Party
Alternate members of the 4th Politburo of the Lao People's Revolutionary Party
Members of the 5th Politburo of the Lao People's Revolutionary Party
Members of the 6th Politburo of the Lao People's Revolutionary Party
Members of the 4th Secretariat of the Lao People's Revolutionary Party
Lao People's Revolutionary Party politicians
1931 births
1999 deaths